Razia Matin Chowdhury (died 2012) was a Awami League politician and a Member of the Parliament from a reserved seat.

Career 
Chowdhury was elected to parliament from a reserved seat as a Awami League candidate in 1996. She served as the Principal of Dhaka University Laboratory School and College. She was a presiding member of the Bangabandhu Parishad and the former president of the University Women's Federation College.

Personal life 
Chowdhury was married to Abdul Matin Chowdhury.

Death 
Chowdhury died on 2 May 2012 in Z H Sikder Women's Medical College & Hospital, Dhaka, Bangladesh. She was buried at Banani Graveyard.

References 

7th Jatiya Sangsad members
Women members of the Jatiya Sangsad
Awami League politicians
2012 deaths
20th-century Bangladeshi women politicians